TPC Sugarloaf is a 27-hole private golf club in the southeastern United States, located within the gated community at Sugarloaf Country Club outside the official city limits of Duluth, Georgia, a suburb northeast of Atlanta.

The facility consists of three 9-hole courses designed by Greg Norman, and is a member of the Tournament Players Club network operated by the PGA Tour. It was the home of the tour's annual AT&T Classic (formerly the BellSouth Classic) from 1997 until it ended in 2008. It began hosting the Mitsubishi Electric Classic (formerly the Greater Gwinnett Championship) on the PGA Tour Champions in 2013.

The BellSouth/AT&T Classic was always played over the original two nines, The Stables and The Meadows, which opened the week before its first staging of the tournament in 1997. Just weeks beforehand, the property was hit by a tornado which damaged many trees on the first and ninth holes, and leveled some of the corporate tent structures around the 18th green. The third nine, The Pines, opened in 2000.

The land was formerly the O. Wayne Rollins family farm, where they kept pure-bred cattle and horses.

References

External links
 
 Golf Nation: Overhead views of each hole

Golf clubs and courses in Georgia (U.S. state)
Buildings and structures in Gwinnett County, Georgia
1997 establishments in Georgia (U.S. state)